The Royal Commission on the Electoral System was formed in New Zealand in 1985 and reported in 1986. The decision to form the Royal Commission was taken by the Fourth Labour government, after the Labour Party had received more votes, yet it won fewer seats than the National Party in both the 1978 and 1981 elections. It was also a reaction to the power displayed by Prime Minister Robert Muldoon, whose action of illegally abolishing the Superannuation scheme in 1975 without any repercussions highlighted the need to distribute power in a more democratic way. The Royal Commission's report Towards a Better Democracy was instrumental in effecting New Zealand to change its electoral system from first-past-the-post to mixed member proportional.

Membership
The Royal Commission consisted of
The Hon. Justice John Wallace QC (Chairman)
John Darwin
Kenneth Keith
Richard Mulgan
Whetumarama Wereta (Māori representative)

Criteria
The Royal Commission established ten criteria for choosing an electoral system. The criteria were not weighed equally by the commission, and a balance was sought.

1. Fairness between political parties
The number of seats in the House should roughly reflect the number of votes received
2. Effective representation of minority and special interest groups
The membership of Parliament should reflect the divisions of society
3. Effective Māori representation
Māori should be fairly and effectively represented in House
Treaty of Waitangi & aboriginal rights should be respected
4. Political Integration
All groups should respect views taken by others in society
5. Effective representation of constituents
An electoral system should encourage close links and accountability to the community
6. Effective voter participation
The voting system should be understandable
Power should be hands of voters to make/unmake governments
7. Effective government
Governments should be able to act decisively and fulfil their responsibilities to their voters
8. Effective Parliament
Parliament should be independent from government control
Parliament should be able to authorise spending and taxation as well as legislate
9. Effective parties
Political parties should be formulating policy and providing representation
10. Legitimacy
Fair and reasonable to the community

The Commission evaluated first-past-the-post, single transferable vote, Supplementary Member, Alternative Vote and mixed member proportional.

Recommendations
 The Commission unanimously recommended the adoption of mixed member proportional, with a threshold of 4% and that a referendum be held before or at the 1987 election.
 They also recommended that the Māori electorates be abolished, with Māori parties instead receiving representation if they did not pass the threshold.
 That the number of MPs raise to 120 (although they considered 140 would be ideal, they realised that it would receive too much public backlash).
 The term of Parliament be raised to four years.
 The Commission recommended that citizens initiated referendums not be implemented. However, they were in 1993.

Implementation
In 1992 and 1993, two referendums were held, resulting in the adoption of MMP. The threshold was changed to 5% and the Māori electorates were retained instead of allowing Māori parties to avoid the threshold. The number of MPs was increased to 120.

A referendum was held on increasing the term of Parliament to four years in 1990. It failed to pass; Parliament continues operating under a three-year term.

See also
 Electoral reform in New Zealand
 Electoral system of New Zealand
 Royal Commission on the Electoral System, Report of the Royal Commission on the Electoral System: Towards a Better Democracy, Wellington: Government Printers, 1986
 Citizens' Assembly on Electoral Reform (British Columbia)

References

External links
Electronic copy of the Royal Commission's report
Elections New Zealand History of the Vote: From FPP to MMP
History of MMP reform at nzhistory.net.nz
 Electoral Reform Coalition
 New Zealand's Change to MMP by Paul Harris

Political history of New Zealand
Constitution of New Zealand
History and use of electoral systems
Electoral reform in New Zealand
Royal commissions in New Zealand
1980s in New Zealand
1986 in New Zealand